The Naruto manga is written by Masashi Kishimoto and is published by Shueisha in the Weekly Shōnen Jump magazine, in twenty-page installments. Part I follows the title character named Naruto Uzumaki, an energetic and determined pre-teen ninja with superhuman ninjutsu abilities, who is the host of the Nine-Tailed Fox that was sealed inside of him 12 years ago before the series began, seeks recognition from his peers, and dreams to become the Hokage, the strongest ninja leader of the Hidden Leaf Village in order to gain respect from the villagers. The first chapter of Naruto was published in issue 43 from 1999. continuing to more than seven hundred chapters in all. The Naruto manga is serialized in North America by Viz Media in their manga anthology magazine Shonen Jump, with the first chapter of the English adaptation published in the January 2003 issue. The Naruto manga is split in two parts to divide the storyline; the first part, Part I, covers the first two hundred thirty-eight chapters of the series. Part II of the Naruto storyline begins at the two hundred forty-fifth chapter, and takes place two and a half years after the end of Part I which focuses on teenage Naruto's return. An anime adaptation of the series, produced by Studio Pierrot and TV Tokyo, was aired on TV Tokyo, with the first episode shown on October 3, 2002. The last episode of the Naruto anime aired on February 8, 2007, with the anime adaptation of Part II, known as Naruto: Shippūden, to replace it.

The chapters that make Part I have been composed into twenty-seven tankōbon in Japan by Shueisha. The first tankōbon was published on March 3, 2000, and the twenty-seventh on April 4, 2005. Most of the tankōbon contains nine chapters from the original manga. Viz Media has also published all twenty-seven volumes of the English adaptation of Part I in North America. In addition, Viz Media has published the twenty-seven volumes within a boxed set, thus constituting the entirety of the Naruto storyline before Part II, on August 26, 2008. A "Collector's Edition" of volume 1, adding a hardcover, was also published on September 16, 2008, by Viz.

The "Naruto Nation" campaign, a plan to release three volumes each month in the last four months of 2007, was announced by Viz Media shortly before the release of the fourteenth volume. Cammie Allen, Viz Media's product manager, commented that, "Our main reason [for the accelerated schedule] was to catch up to the Japanese release schedule to give our readers a similar experience to that of our readers in Japan." As such, the English serialization of Part II premiered on December 4, 2007, in Shonen Jump.



Volume list

See also
 List of Naruto chapters (Part II, volumes 28–48)
 List of Naruto chapters (Part II, volumes 49–72)

References

External links
 Official Shueisha Naruto site 
 Official Viz Media Naruto site

Chapters (Part I)

bg:Списък с манга томовете на Наруто#Част I
es:Anexo:Volúmenes de Naruto#Primera parte
it:Capitoli di Naruto#Parte I